Amilcare Canevari (9 June 1905 – 1 August 1987) was an Italian rower. He competed at the 1928 Summer Olympics in Amsterdam with the men's eight where they were eliminated in the quarter-final.

References

1905 births
1987 deaths
Italian male rowers
Olympic rowers of Italy
Rowers at the 1928 Summer Olympics
Sportspeople from Piacenza
European Rowing Championships medalists
20th-century Italian people